Limonium californicum is a species of sea lavender in the family Plumbaginaceae. It is known by the common names western marsh rosemary and California sea lavender.

Description
This is a tough perennial herb growing from a woody rhizome. The thick, leathery leaves are oval in shape and up to about 30 centimeters long including the petioles, located in a basal rosette about the stem. The inflorescence is a stiff, branching panicle no more than about 35 centimeters tall bearing large clusters of flowers. The flowers have brownish white ribbed sepals and lavender to nearly white petals.

Range
L. californicum is native to western North America from Oregon to Baja California, with occasional sightings in Nevada and Arizona.

Habitat
L. californicum is found on coastal beaches, salt marshes, and coastal prairie, and other sandy saline and alkaline habitat such as playas.

References

External links
Jepson Manual Treatment
Photo gallery

californicum
Flora of California
Flora of Baja California
Flora of Oregon
Taxa named by Pierre Edmond Boissier
Taxa named by Amos Arthur Heller
Flora without expected TNC conservation status